Isabella Karle (December 2, 1921 – October 3, 2017) was an American chemist who was instrumental in developing techniques to extract plutonium chloride from a mixture containing plutonium oxide. For her scientific work, Karle received the Garvan–Olin Medal, Gregori Aminoff Prize, Bower Award, National Medal of Science, and the Navy Distinguished Civilian Service Award (which is the Navy's highest form of recognition to civilian employees).

Early life

She was born as Isabella Helen Lugoski in Detroit, Michigan  on December 2, 1921, the daughter of immigrants from Poland. She attended the local public schools, while at school, a female chemistry teacher led her to her pursuit of the field as a career. She attended the University of Michigan on full scholarship, where she majored in physical chemistry and received a Bachelor of Science at age 19, followed by Master of Science and Ph.D. degrees in the field. During her graduate work she met her future husband and scientific collaborator Jerome Karle; the two were both advised in their Ph.D. studies by Lawrence Brockway.

Career
Karle worked on the Manhattan Project during World War II, where she developed techniques to extract plutonium chloride from a mixture containing plutonium oxide.

She joined the United States Naval Research Laboratory (NRL) after the end of the war. At the NRL, her husband Jerome developed "direct methods" for analyzing structure of crystals. However, for many years the crystallographic community remained skeptical about their utility. Isabella Karle was the first person to apply the method. She developed the symbolic addition procedure that connects the theoretical "direct method" apparatus and actual X-ray diffraction data. These contributions advanced the field of X-ray crystallography by enabling determination of the structure of crystals. This technique has played a major role in the development of new pharmaceutical products and other synthesized materials.

In 1985, Jerome Karle was awarded the Nobel Prize in Chemistry, together with mathematician Herbert A. Hauptman, for developing direct methods for analyzing X-ray diffraction data. Jerome Karle and many other members of the crystallography community strongly believed that Isabella Karle should have shared the prize.

Karle received many honors. She was elected a Fellow of the National Academy of Sciences (1978) and the American Academy of Arts and Sciences (1993). She was elected to the American Philosophical Society in 1992. In addition, she received the National Medal of Science (1995), various awards, and eight honorary doctorates.

On July 31, 2009, Karle and her husband retired from the Naval Research Laboratory, after a combined 127 years of service to the United States Government, with Karle joining the NRL in 1946, two years after her husband. Retirement ceremonies for the Karles were attended by United States Secretary of the Navy Ray Mabus, who presented the couple with the Department of the Navy Distinguished Civilian Service Award, the Navy's highest form of recognition to civilian employees.

Death

She died on October 3, 2017 at a hospice in Alexandria, Virginia.

Personal life
Karle was married to Jerome Karle with whom she had three daughters, all of whom work in scientific fields:
Louise Karle (born 1946) is a theoretical chemist
Jean Karle (1950) is an organic chemist
Madeleine Karle (1955) is a museum specialist with expertise in the field of geology.

Awards
Garvan–Olin Medal (1976)
Rear Admiral William S. Parsons Award (1988)
Gregori Aminoff Prize (1988)
 Bijvoet Medal of the Bijvoet Center for Biomolecular Research (1989) 
Bower Award (1993)
National Medal of Science (1995)
Navy Distinguished Civilian Service Award (2009)

References

Further reading

</ref>

External links 

2015 Video interview with Isabella Karle by the Atomic Heritage Foundation Voices of the Manhattan Project
2005 Video Interview with Isabella Karle by the Atomic Heritage Foundation Voices of the Manhattan Project

1921 births
2017 deaths
American crystallographers
Scientists from Detroit
University of Michigan College of Literature, Science, and the Arts alumni
American biophysicists
National Medal of Science laureates
Recipients of the Garvan–Olin Medal
American women chemists
Fellows of the American Academy of Arts and Sciences
Members of the United States National Academy of Sciences
American physical chemists
Manhattan Project people
Women biophysicists
Bijvoet Medal recipients
Women on the Manhattan Project
Members of the American Philosophical Society